List of county routes in Elko County, located in northeastern Nevada.

Elko County routes

References 

Transportation in Elko County, Nevada
County Elko